Events during the year 1116 in Italy

Events
 Ordelafo Faliero leads the Venetian armies and successfully conquered Dalmatia but dies in the process

Deaths
 Robert of Caiazzo

References 

Years of the 12th century in Italy
Italy
Italy